The Albert Löfgren State Park, commonly known as the São Paulo Forest Gardens is a state park in the state of São Paulo, Brazil.

Location

The Albert Löfgren State Park is in the north of the city of São Paulo, adjoining the Cantareira State Park.
About  of the park are public space.
It is open every day from 6am to 6pm.
The park gets about 720,000 visitors each year.

History

The area was expropriated by the Engenho da Pedra Branca in 1896 to hold a botanical garden.
The Swedish naturalist and botanist Albert Löfgren created the park and was the first director, from 1907 to 1909.
The garden became the base for the Forest Service, today the Forest Institute of the São Paulo Secretariat of the Environment.
Pines planted when the park was founded can still be seen in the Albert Löefgren Arboretum.

Facilities

The park has a stage for events, picnic area, playground, changing room, jogging track, sports court, soccer fields, exercise equipment, drinking water, lakes and toilets.
It contains an environmental education center,  the Summer Palace of the state government and the headquarters of the state military police and forest police.
The Octavio Vecchi Museum, or Wood Museum, was inaugurated in 1931.
It has the largest collection of different woods in Latin America.
The wood samples have engravings of the leaves and fruit of the tree they came from.
The floor and ceiling are also made of wood samples.
There is a monument marking the Tropic of Capricorn, which passes through the park.
There are no snack bars in the park, but there are places to eat around the main entrance.

Vegetation includes exotic species such as eucalyptus, pinheiro-do-brejo (Taxodium distichum) and cryptomeria, as well as native trees such as pau-brasil (Caesalpinia echinata), carvalho-nacional (Quercus faginea), pau-ferro (Libidibia ferrea) and jatobá (Hymenaea courbaril).
Fauna include robust capuchin monkeys, Brazilian squirrel (Sciurus aestuans), opossums (Didelphis), toucans,  storks, herons, rufous-collared sparrow (Zonotrichia capensis) and kingfishers.

Notes

Sources

State parks of Brazil
Protected areas established in 1896
1896 establishments in Brazil
Protected areas of São Paulo (state)
Parks in São Paulo